The British Ambassador to the Netherlands is the United Kingdom's foremost diplomatic representative in the Netherlands, and head of the UK's diplomatic mission in the Netherlands. The official title is His Britannic Majesty's Ambassador to the Kingdom of the Netherlands.

Since the formation in 1997 of the Organisation for the Prohibition of Chemical Weapons (OPCW), which is located in The Hague, the British Ambassador to the Netherlands has also been the UK's Permanent Representative to the OPCW, assisted by a Chemical Weapons team at the Embassy.

Besides the embassy in The Hague, the UK also maintains a consulate general in Amsterdam.

List of heads of mission

Envoys to the Prince of Orange
 1575−1578: Daniel Rogers Agent and Special agent 1578–1579
 1575−1576: Robert Corbet Special Ambassador
 1577: Philip Sidney Special Ambassador
 1577−1579: William Davison Resident agent; Special Ambassador 1584–1585; English Councillor 1585−1586
 1585−1586: Henry Killigrew and Dr Bartholomew Clerke English Councillors on the Dutch Council of State
 1586−1587: Thomas Wilkes Special Ambassador then English Councillor on the Dutch Council of State; also 1578, 1582, and 1590
 1587−1589: Henry Killigrew English Councillor on the Dutch Council of State
 1588−1593: Thomas Bodley English Councillor on the Dutch Council of State; again 1594−1596
 1593−1602: George Gilpin English Councillor on the Dutch Council of State

Ambassadors to the United Provinces
 1603–1613: Sir Ralph Winwood Agent 1603–1607; Commissioner (with Spencer) 1607–1609; then Resident ambassador
 1607–1609: Sir Richard Spencer Commissioner (with Winwood) 
 1614–1615: Sir Henry Wotton
 1615–1625 and 1626–1628: Sir Dudley Carleton
 1625: George Villiers, 1st Duke of Buckingham Ambassador Extraordinary
 1625–1632: Dudley Carleton, his nephew Chargé d'Affaires; then Agent
 1632–1649: Sir William Boswell Agent until 1634; then Ambassador
 1642–1650: Walter Strickland Ambassador (appointed by Parliament)
 1644: Henry Jermyn, 1st Baron Jermyn Ambassador
 No representation due to the First Anglo-Dutch War 1652–1654
 1657–1665: Sir George Downing
 No representation due to the Second Anglo-Dutch War 1665–1667
 1668–1670: Sir William Temple, Bt
 1671–1672: William Blathwayt Chargé d'Affaires
No representation due to the Third Anglo-Dutch War 1672–1674
 1674–1679: Sir William Temple, Bt
 1678–1679: Roger Meredith Chargé d'Affaires
 1679–1681: Henry Sidney

Envoys Extraordinary and Ministers Plenipotentiary to the United Provinces
 1681–1682: Thomas Plott Agent
 1681–1685: Thomas Chudleigh
 1685–1686: Bevil Skelton Ambassador
 1686–1688: Ignatius White

Ambassadors to the United Provinces
 1689: Thomas Herbert, Earl of Pembroke
 1689–1695: Charles Berkeley, Viscount Dursley Envoy Extraordinary
 1690: William Harbord
 1695–1697: Edward Villiers, 1st Viscount Villiers
 1697–1699: Sir Joseph Williamson
 1700–1706: Alexander Stanhope Envoy Extraordinary
 1701 and 1702–1712: John Churchill, 1st Duke of Marlborough
 1706–1712: James Dayrolle Resident
 1706–1707: George Stepney Envoy Extraordinary (but rarely at The Hague)
 1707–1709: William Cadogan Envoy Extraordinary (but rarely at The Hague)
 1709–1711: Charles Townshend, 2nd Viscount Townshend
 1711: Charles Boyle, Earl of Orrery Envoy Extraordinary
 1711–1714: Thomas Wentworth, 1st Earl of Strafford
 1714–1720 William Cadogan, 1st Earl Cadogan Envoy Extraordinary until 1716 then Ambassador
 Jan – Apr 1715 and Oct 1715–Oct 1716: Horatio Walpole
 1717: William Leathes seconded as Resident from his post in Brussels
 1717–1721: Charles Whitworth Envoy Extraordinary 1717; then Minister Plenipotentiary (seconded from his post in Berlin)
 1717–1739: James Dayrolle Resident

Envoys Extraordinary and Ministers Plenipotentiary to the United Provinces
 May-Jul 1722: Horatio Walpole Minister Plenipotentiary
 1724–1728: William Finch Envoy Extraordinary
 1728–1732: Philip Stanhope, 4th Earl of Chesterfield Ambassador
 1733–1734: William Finch Minister Plenipotentiarywww.inghist.nl
 1734–1739: Horatio Walpole Minister 1734; then Envoy Extraordinary (absent 1736-Jun 1739)
 1736–1746: Robert Trevor (Secretary 1736–1736; then Envoy Extraordinary until 1741, then also Minister Plenipotentiary)
 1742–1743: John Dalrymple, 2nd Earl of Stair Ambassador
 1745: Philip Stanhope, Earl of Chesterfield
 1746–1749: John Montagu, Earl of Sandwich Minister Plenipotentiary
 1747–1752: Solomon Dayrolle Resident
 1749–1751: Robert Darcy, 4th Earl of Holderness Minister Plenipotentiary
 1751–1780: Joseph Yorke Minister Plenipotentiary until 1761 then Ambassador
No representation due to the Fourth Anglo-Dutch War 1780–1784
 1784–1789: Sir James Harris Minister Plenipotentiary until 1788; then (as Lord Malmesbury) Ambassador
 1789–1790: Alleyne Fitzherbert Envoy Extraordinary
 1790–1793: William Eden, 1st Baron Auckland (ambassador)
 1790–1793: Lord Henry John Spencer Secretary, but Minister ad interim 1791–1792 and 1793
 1793–1794: Hon. William Eliot Minister ad interim
 1794–1795: Alleyne FitzHerbert
Diplomatic Relations suspended 1795–1802

Envoy Extraordinary and Minister Plenipotentiary to the Batavian Republic
 1802–1803: Robert Liston
Diplomatic Relations suspended 1803–1813

Ambassadors to the United Kingdom of the Netherlands
Under the Treaty of Vienna in 1815, the northern and southern Netherlands were united into the United Kingdom of the Netherlands.
 1813–1815: Richard Trench, 2nd Earl of Clancarty
 1815: Sir Charles Stuart
 1815–1816: Mr John James Minister ad interim
 1816–1817: Mr George William Chad Minister ad interim
 1817–1824: Richard Trench, 2nd Earl of Clancarty
 1818–1819, 1819, 1822 and 1824: Mr George William Chad Minister ad interim
 1824: Granville Leveson-Gower, 1st Viscount Granville
 1824: Sir Andrew Snape Douglas (ad interim)
 1824–1829: Sir Charles Bagot
 1829–1832: Sir Thomas Cartwright (ad interim)
The United Kingdom of the Netherlands was dissolved by the secession of the Southern Netherlands in the Belgian Revolution

Envoys Extraordinary and Ministers Plenipotentiary to the Netherlands
 1832: Hon. John Duncan Bligh (ad interim)
 1833–1836: Hon. George Jerningham Chargé d'affaires
 1836–1851: Sir Edward Cromwell Disbrowe
 1851–1858: Sir Ralph Abercromby
 1858–1860: Francis Napier, 10th Lord Napier
 1860–1862: Sir Andrew Buchanan
 1862–1867: Sir John Ralph Milbanke, 8th Bt
 1867–1877: Hon. Edward Harris
 1877–1888: Hon. William Stuart
 1888–1896: Sir Horace Rumbold, 8th Bt
 1896–1908: Sir Henry Howard
 1908–1910: Sir George Buchanan
 1910–1917: Hon. Sir Alan Johnstone
 1917–1919: Sir Walter Townley
 1919–1921: Sir Ronald Graham
 1921–1926: Sir Charles Marling
 1926–1928: Granville Leveson-Gower, 3rd Earl Granville
 1928–1933: Hon. Sir Odo Russell
 1933–1938: Sir Hubert Montgomery
 1938–1942: Sir Nevile Bland

Ambassadors to the Netherlands
 1942–1948: Sir Nevile Bland
 1948–1952: Sir Philip Nichols
 1952–1954: Sir Nevile Butler
 1954–1960: Sir Paul Mason
 1960–1964: Sir Andrew Noble
 1964–1970: Sir Peter Garran
 1970–1972: Sir Edward Tomkins
 1972–1977: Sir John Barnes
 1977–1979: Sir Richard Sykes
 1979–1981: Sir Jock Taylor
 1981–1984: Sir Philip Mansfield
 1984–1988: Sir John Margetson
 1988–1993: Sir Michael Jenkins
 1993–1996: Sir David Miers
 1996–2001: Dame Rosemary Spencer
 2001–2005: Sir Colin Budd
 2005–2009: Mr Lyn Parker
 2009–2013: Mr Paul Arkwright
 2013–2017: Sir Geoffrey Adams
 2017–2020:  Hon. Peter Wilson

 2020–: Mrs Joanna Roper

See also
 Netherlands – United Kingdom relations

References

External links
 British Embassy The Hague

Netherlands
 
 
United Kingdom